The Polish National Committee of 1831 to 1832 was one of the first Polish organizations of the Great Emigration into France. 

It was founded soon after the failure of the November Uprising, led by Joachim Lelewel. 

It tried to gather various groups of Polish republicans, but despite support from French republicans, it ended its activity in 1832, both due to being closed by French police, and due to internal tensions.

Great Emigration
1830s in Poland
Polish independence organisations
Organizations established in 1831
Organizations disestablished in 1832
1831 establishments in France
1831 establishments in Poland
1832 disestablishments in France
1830s disestablishments in Poland